Wymark is a surname. Notable people with the surname include:

Jane Wymark (born 1952), English actress
Olwen Wymark (1932–2013), American playwright
Patrick Wymark (1926–1970), born Patrick Carl Cheeseman, an English stage, film and television actor

See also
Wymark, Saskatchewan, hamlet in the Canadian province of Saskatchewan
Wymer